Mikhail Nekhemyevich Tal (9 November 1936 – 28 June 1992) was a Soviet-Latvian chess player and the eighth World Chess Champion. He is considered a creative genius and is widely regarded as one of the most influential chess players. Tal played in an attacking and daring combinatorial style. His play was known above all for improvisation and unpredictability. Vladislav Zubok said of him, "Every game for him was as inimitable and invaluable as a poem".

His nickname was "Misha", a diminutive for Mikhail, and he earned the nickname "The Magician from Riga". Both The Mammoth Book of the World's Greatest Chess Games and Modern Chess Brilliancies include more games by Tal than any other player. He also held the record for the longest unbeaten streak in competitive chess history with 95 games (46 wins, 49 draws) between 23 October 1973 and 16 October 1974, until Ding Liren's streak of 100 games (29 wins, 71 draws) between 9 August 2017 and 11 November 2018. In addition, Tal was a highly regarded chess writer.

Tal died on 28 June 1992 in Moscow, Russia. The Mikhail Tal Memorial chess tournament has been held in Moscow annually since 2006.

Early years

Tal was born in Riga, Republic of Latvia, into a Jewish family. According to his friend Gennadi Sosonko, his true father was a family friend identified only as "Uncle Robert"; however, this was vehemently denied by Tal's third wife Angelina. Uncle Robert had been a taxi driver in Paris in the 1920s and had lost all his family in World War II. His mother, Ida Grigoryevna, was the eldest of four sisters; Tal frequently visited the Netherlands to see his aunt, Riva and another of his aunts settled in the US but visited Riga.

As a child, Tal joined the Riga Palace of Young Pioneers chess club. In 1949, he played Ratmir Kholmov, a young master who had recently competed in the prestigious Chigorin Memorial in 1947, in a simultaneous exhibition. Tal used an imaginative combination to win his game at the age of 13. 

Alexander Koblents began tutoring him in 1949, after which Tal's game rapidly improved, and by 1951 he had qualified for the Latvian Championship. In the 1952 Latvian Championship, Tal finished ahead of his trainer. Tal won his first Latvian title in 1953, and was awarded the title of Candidate Master. He became a Soviet Master in 1954 by defeating Vladimir Saigin in a qualifying match. That same year he also scored his first win over a grandmaster when Yuri Averbakh lost on time in a drawn position. Tal graduated in Literature from the University of Latvia, writing a thesis on the satirical works of Ilf and Petrov, and taught school in Riga for a time in his early twenties. He was a member of the Daugava Sports Society, and represented Latvia in internal Soviet team competitions.

In 1959 he married 19-year-old Salli Landau, an actress with the Riga Youth Theatre; they divorced in 1970. In 2003, Landau published a biography in Russia of her late ex-husband.

Soviet champion
Tal made his first significant appearance at the 1956 USSR Chess Championship, sharing 5th–7th place with Lev Polugaevsky and Ratmir Kholmov. Grigory Levenfish called him "the most colourful figure of the championship" and a "great talent" who strived for "sharp and complicated play". However, he was criticised by the media for taking unnecessary risks and having restricted creative views. Tal then went to play on board three at the students' championship in Sweden, scoring 6 out of 7.

He became the youngest player to win the USSR Championship the following year, at the age of 20. He had not played in enough international tournaments to qualify for the title of Grandmaster, but FIDE decided at its 1957 Congress to waive the normal restrictions and award him the title because of his achievement in winning the Soviet Championship. At that time, the Soviet Union was dominant in world chess, and Tal had beaten several of the world's top players to win the tournament.

Tal made three appearances for the USSR at Student Olympiads in 1956–1958, winning three team gold medals and three board gold medals. He won nineteen games, drew eight, and lost none, for 85.2 percent.

He retained the Soviet Championship title in 1958 at Riga, and competed in the World Chess Championship for the first time. He won the 1958 Interzonal tournament at Portorož, then helped the Soviet Union to win its fourth consecutive Chess Olympiad at Munich.

World Champion

Tal won a very strong tournament at Zürich, 1959. Following the Interzonal, the top players carried on to the Candidates' Tournament, Yugoslavia 1959. Tal showed superior form by winning with 20/28 points, ahead of Paul Keres with 18½, followed by Tigran Petrosian, Vasily Smyslov, the sixteen-year-old Bobby Fischer, Svetozar Gligorić, Friðrik Ólafsson, and Pal Benko. Tal's victory was attributed to his dominance over the lower half of the field; whilst scoring only one win and three losses versus Keres, he won all four individual games against Fischer, and took 3½ points out of 4 from each of Gligorić, Olafsson, and Benko. When Benko arrived for his match with Tal, he wore dark glasses in order to avert the gaze of Tal, which could be intimidating. In response and as a joke, Tal wore large sunglasses which he borrowed from a member of the crowd.

In 1960, at the age of 23, Tal defeated the strategic-minded Mikhail Botvinnik in a World Championship match, held in Moscow, by 12½–8½ (six wins, two losses, and thirteen draws), making him the youngest-ever World Champion (a record later broken by Garry Kasparov, who earned the title at 22). Botvinnik, who had never faced Tal before the title match began, won the return match against Tal in 1961, also held in Moscow, by 13–8 (ten wins to five, with six draws). In the period between the matches Botvinnik had thoroughly analysed Tal's style, and turned most of the return match's games into slow wars of maneuver or endgames, rather than the complicated tactical melees which were Tal's happy hunting ground.
Tal's chronic kidney problems contributed to his defeat, and his doctors in Riga advised that he should postpone the match for health reasons. Yuri Averbakh claimed that Botvinnik would agree to a postponement only if Tal was certified unfit by Moscow doctors, and that Tal then decided to play. His short reign atop the chess world made him one of the two so-called "winter kings" who interrupted Botvinnik's long reign from 1948 to 1963 (the other was Smyslov, world champion 1957–58).

His highest Elo rating was 2705, achieved in 1980. His highest Historical Chessmetrics Rating was 2799, in September 1960.

Later achievements

Soon after losing the rematch with Botvinnik, Tal won the 1961 Bled supertournament by one point over Fischer, despite losing their individual game, scoring 14½ from nineteen games (+11−1=7) with the world-class players Tigran Petrosian, Keres, Gligorić, Efim Geller, and Miguel Najdorf among the other participants.

Tal played in a total of six Candidates' Tournaments and match cycles, though he never again earned the right to play for the world title. In 1962 at Curaçao, he had serious health problems, having undergone a major operation shortly before the tournament, and had to withdraw three-quarters of the way through, scoring just seven points (+3−10=8) from 21 games. He tied for first place at the 1964 Amsterdam Interzonal to advance to matches. Then in 1965, he lost the final match against Boris Spassky, after defeating Lajos Portisch and Bent Larsen in matches. Exempt from the 1967 Interzonal, he lost a 1968 semifinal match against Viktor Korchnoi, after defeating Gligorić.

Poor health caused a slump in his play from late 1968 to late 1969, but he recovered his form after having a kidney removed. He won the 1979 Riga Interzonal with an undefeated score of 14/17, but the next year lost a quarter-final match to Lev Polugaevsky, one of the players to hold a positive score against him. He also played in the 1985 Montpellier Candidates' Tournament, a round-robin of 16 qualifiers, finishing in a tie for fourth and fifth places, and narrowly missing further advancement after drawing a playoff match with Jan Timman, who held the tiebreak advantage from the tournament proper.

From July 1972 to April 1973, Tal played a record 86 consecutive games without a loss (47 wins and 39 draws). Between 23 October 1973 and 16 October 1974, he played 95 consecutive games without a loss (46 wins and 49 draws), shattering his previous record. These were the two longest unbeaten streaks in competitive chess for more than four decades, until Ding Liren broke the record in 2018 with 100 games, although with far fewer wins than either of Tal's streaks (29 wins, 71 draws).

Tal remained a formidable opponent as he got older. He played Anatoly Karpov 22 times, 12 of them during the latter's reign as World Champion, with a record of +0−1=19 in classical games and +1−2=19 overall.

One of Tal's greatest achievements during his later career was an equal first place with Karpov (whom he seconded in a number of tournaments and world championships) in the 1979 Montreal "Tournament of Stars", with an unbeaten score of (+6−0=12), the only undefeated player in the field, which also included Spassky, Portisch, Vlastimil Hort, Robert Hübner, Ljubomir Ljubojević, Lubomir Kavalek, Jan Timman and Larsen.

Tal played in 21 Soviet Championships, winning it six times (1957, 1958, 1967, 1972, 1974, 1978). He was also a five-time winner of the International Chess Tournament in Tallinn, Estonia, with victories in 1971, 1973, 1977, 1981, and 1983.

Tal also had successes in blitz chess; in 1970, he took second place to Fischer, who scored 19/22, in a blitz tournament at Herceg Novi, Yugoslavia, ahead of Korchnoi, Petrosian and Smyslov. In 1988, at the age of 51, he won the second official World Blitz Championship (the first was won by Kasparov the previous year in Brussels) at Saint John, ahead of such players as Kasparov, the reigning world champion, and ex-champion Anatoly Karpov. In the final, he defeated Rafael Vaganian by 3½–½.

On 28 May 1992, at the Moscow blitz tournament (which he left the hospital to play), he defeated Kasparov. He died one month later.

Team competitions
In Olympiad play, Mikhail Tal was a member of eight Soviet teams, each of which won team gold medals (1958, 1960, 1962, 1966, 1972, 1974, 1980, and 1982), won 65 games, drew 34, and lost only two games (81.2 percent). This percentage makes him the player with the best score among those participating in at least four Olympiads. Individually, Tal won seven Olympiad board medals, including five gold (1958, 1962, 1966, 1972, 1974), and two silver (1960, 1982).

Tal also represented the Soviet Union at six European Team Championships (1957, 1961, 1970, 1973, 1977, 1980), winning team gold medals each time, and three board gold medals (1957, 1970, and 1977). He scored 14 wins, 20 draws, and three losses, for 64.9 percent.
Tal played board nine for the USSR in the first match against the Rest of the World team at Belgrade 1970, scoring 2 out of 4. He was on board seven for the USSR in the second match against the Rest of the World team at London 1984, scoring 2 out of 3. The USSR won both team matches. He was an Honoured Master of Sport.

From 1950 (when he won the Latvian junior championship) to 1991, Tal won or tied for first in 68 tournaments (see table below). During his 41-year career he played about 2,700 tournament or match games, winning over 65% of them.

Health problems and death

Naturally artistic, witty and impulsive, Tal led a bohemian life of chess playing, heavy drinking and chain smoking. His already fragile health suffered as a result, and he spent a great deal of time in the hospital, including an operation to remove a kidney in 1969. He was also briefly addicted to morphine, prescribed due to intense pain. Tal also drank heavily before tournaments; in a tournament in the Netherlands, Tal and another Soviet grandmaster were tied in the standings, and the results of the next day's final games would determine the victor. The night before these games, the two drank together until four in the morning. Tal continued to win his game decisively along with the tournament.

On 28 June 1992, Tal died in a Moscow hospital, officially of a haemorrhage in the oesophagus. But his friend and fellow Soviet grandmaster Genna Sosonko reported that "effectively his entire organism had ceased to function."

Tal had the congenital deformity of ectrodactyly in his right hand (visible in some photographs). Despite this, he was a skilled piano player.

Playing style
Tal loved the game in itself and considered that "chess, first of all, is art." He was known to play numerous blitz games against unknown or relatively weak players purely for the joy of playing.

Known as "The Magician from Riga", Tal was the archetype of the attacking player, developing an extremely powerful and imaginative style of play. His approach over the board was very pragmatic—in that respect, he is one of the heirs of ex-world champion Emanuel Lasker. He often sacrificed material in search of the initiative, which is defined as the ability to make threats to which the opponent must respond. With such intuitive sacrifices, he created vast complications, and many masters found it impossible to solve all the problems he created over the board, though deeper post-game analysis found flaws in some of his conceptions. The famous sixth game of his first world championship match with Botvinnik is typical in that regard: Tal sacrificed a knight with little compensation but prevailed when the unsettled Botvinnik failed to find the correct response. Tal's style of play was so intimidating that James Eade listed Tal as one of the three players whom contemporaries were most afraid of playing against (the others being Capablanca and Fischer). However, while Capablanca and Fischer were feared because of their extreme technical skill, Tal was feared because of the possibility of being on the wrong side of a soon-to-be-famous brilliancy. Although Tal's sacrifices were formidable, some of the best players of the time were successful in refuting them, contributing to his negative record against some of the top players of the time. These included Spassky, Petrosian, Polugaevsky, Korchnoi, Keres, Smyslov, and Stein. (Tal has a positive record against Fischer with his four wins from the 1959 candidates tournament, when Fischer was only 16 years old, but never beat Fischer again.)

Although his playing style at first was scorned by ex-world champion Vasily Smyslov as nothing more than "tricks", Tal convincingly beat many notable grandmasters with his trademark aggression. Prevailing against Tal's attack required extraordinary ability. It is also notable that he adopted a more sedate and positional style in his later years; for many chess lovers, the apex of Tal's style corresponds with the period (approximately from 1971 to 1979) when he was able to integrate the solidity of classical chess with the imagination of his youth.

Of the current top-level players, the Latvian Alexei Shirov has been most often compared to Tal. In fact, he studied with Tal as a youth. Many other Latvian grandmasters and masters, for instance Alexander Shabalov and Alvis Vītoliņš, have played in a similar vein, causing some to speak of a "Latvian School of Chess".
Tal contributed little to opening theory, despite having a deep knowledge of most systems, the Sicilian and the Ruy Lopez in particular. However, there are a few openings named after him such as the Tal variation in the Caro-Kann and in the Sicilian Scheveningen. But his aggressive use of the Modern Benoni, particularly in his early years, led to a complete re-evaluation of this variation. A variation of the Nimzo-Indian Defence bears his name.

Notable games
Tal vs. Alexander Tolush, USSR Championship, Moscow 1957, King's Indian Defence, Sämisch Variation (E81), . In a critical last-round game, Tal spares no fireworks as he scores the win that clinches his first Soviet title.
Boris Spassky vs. Tal, USSR Championship, Riga 1958, Nimzo-Indian Defence, Sämisch Variation (E26), . Spassky plays for a win to avoid a playoff for an Interzonal berth, but Tal hangs on by his fingernails before turning the tables in a complex ; with the win, he captures his second straight Soviet title.
Tal vs. Vasily Smyslov, Yugoslavia Candidates' Tournament 1959, Caro–Kann Defence (B10), 1–0.
Robert James Fischer vs. Tal, Belgrade, Candidates' Tournament 1959, Sicilian Defence, Fischer–Sozin Attack (B87), 0–1. Their games from this period are full of interesting tactics.
Mikhail Botvinnik vs. Tal, World Championship Match, Moscow 1960, 6th game, King's Indian Defence, Fianchetto Variation, Classical Main line (E69), 0–1. An excellent sample of Tal's style from the first Botvinnik–Tal match. Tal sacrifices a knight for the attack and Botvinnik is unable to find a good defence in the given time; his 25th move is a mistake that spoils his game.
István Bilek vs. Tal, Moscow 1967, King's Indian Attack, Spassky Variation (A05), 0–1. A risky  is crowned with success, winning a brilliancy prize.
Boris Spassky vs. Tal, Tallinn tt 1973, Nimzo-Indian Defence, Leningrad Variation (E30), 0–1. A game fuelled with tactics from its first moves.
Tal vs. Tigran Petrosian, 8th Soviet Team Cup, Moscow 1974, rd 5, Pirc Defence, Classical System, (B08), 1–0.
Tal vs. Joel Lautier, Barcelona 1992. In his final tournament before his death at age 55, the Magician from Riga produces one last masterpiece against a Grandmaster from the next generation.

Writings
Tal was a prolific and highly respected chess writer, penning a number of books and serving as editor of the Latvian chess magazine Šahs ("Chess") from 1960 to 1970. His books are renowned for the detailed narrative of his thinking during the games. American Grandmaster Andrew Soltis reviewed his book on the world championship match as "simply the best book written about a world championship match by a contestant. That shouldn't be a surprise because Tal was the finest writer to become world champion." New Zealand Grandmaster Murray Chandler wrote in the introduction to the 1997 reissued algebraic edition of The Life and Games of Mikhail Tal that the book was possibly the best chess book ever written.

One amusing anecdote frequently quoted from Tal's autobiography takes the form of a hypothetical conversation between Tal and a journalist (actually co-author Yakov Damsky). It offers a modest, self-deprecating view of his reputation for unerring calculation at the board:

Score with some major grandmasters
Only official tournament or match games have been taken into account. '+' corresponds to Tal's wins, '−' to his losses and '=' to draws. Winning records in bold.

 Mikhail Botvinnik: +12−12=20
 David Bronstein: +12−8=19
 Bobby Fischer: +4−2=5
 Efim Geller: +6−6=23
 Anatoly Karpov: +0−1=19
 Garry Kasparov: +1−2=9
 Paul Keres: +4−8=20
 Viktor Korchnoi: +4−13=27
 Bent Larsen: +12−7=18
 Tigran Petrosian: +4−5=35
 Lev Polugaevsky: +2−8=22
 Lajos Portisch: +9−5=18
 Vasily Smyslov: +3−4=21
 Boris Spassky: +6−9=27
 Leonid Stein: +0−3=15
 Miguel Najdorf: +3−1=5
 Pal Benko: +8−1=3
 Wolfgang Uhlmann: +4−0=3
 Borislav Ivkov: +3−1=11
 Svetozar Gligoric: +10−2=22

Tournament and match wins (or equal first)

1950–1965

1966–1977

1978–1991

Book titles

See also
 List of Jewish chess players

Notes

References

Bibliography

Further reading
 
  This covers Tal's career post 1975, and can therefore be seen as a sort of sequel to Tal's own autobiography and games collection, which covers his career up to that point.

External links

 
 
 Kasparov interview about Tal

 
 

 
 

1936 births
1992 deaths
Sportspeople from Riga
World chess champions
Chess grandmasters
Chess Olympiad competitors
Latvian chess players
Soviet chess players
Jewish chess players
Russian Jews
Latvian Jews
Latvian chess writers
Deaths from kidney failure
University of Latvia alumni
20th-century chess players